Groesbeck, as a person, may refer to:
 Alex J. Groesbeck (1873–1953), American governor of Michigan (1921-1927)
 Herman V.S. Groesbeck (1849–1929), Chief Justice of the Wyoming Supreme Court
 Robert A. Groesbeck, American mayor of Henderson, Nevada (1993-1997)
 William S. Groesbeck (1815–1897), American U.S. Representative of Ohio

Groesbeck, as a place, may refer to: 
 Groesbeck, Ohio, an unincorporated census-designated place in Hamilton County, Ohio, United States
 Groesbeck, Texas, a city in Limestone County, Texas, United States

See also
 Groesbeek